Mahesa Gibran (born 22 March 1987), known as Gibran Marten, is an Indonesian actor and singer.

Life and career
He is son of Roy Marten, an Indonesian actor, and Anna Maria Marten an Indonesian model. He is also known as the youngest brother of Gading Marten, an Indonesian artist and presenter. 
When Marten was still in his college, he began his singing career by joining several bands and performed in pubs or several venues. He performed with his brother Gading Marten in one TV station program in 2011.

He began his acting career in 2014 with several opera soaps of TV stations prior to join in several films such as Pacarku Anak Koruptor(2016)  and TEN: The Secret Mission (2016).

Personal life
Marten went to Atmajaya University majoring in Law.  He is an Orthodox Christian believer.

Filmography

Film

TV Programs 
 Inbox SCTV (December 2011)

Discography 

 Selingkuh (2011)

Song charts 
 Selingkuh

References

External links 
 Gibran Marten

1987 births
Living people
Indo people
Javanese people
Sundanese people
Eastern Orthodox Christians from Indonesia
Indonesian people of Dutch descent
Indonesian people of Malay descent
Indonesian male actors
People from Jakarta